Pawagiri Jain Temple or Gvaleshwar temple is a Jain temple located in Oon village, Khargone district in the state of Madhya Pradesh.

History 
The temple was constructed by Jain merchants who migrated from Malwa following the annexation of King Kumarapala of Chaulukya dynasty in 1150 CE. The  pedestal of the Tirthankara idol inside the temple bears an inscription dated 1263 CE (V.S. 1321).

Description 
The temple plan is similar to Chaubara Dera 2, another nearby Jain temple.

The main  enshrines three polished black coloured idols and the central idol is the mulnayak of the temple. The mulnayak is a  idol tall of Shantinatha that bears an inscription dated 1206 CE.

This temple is protected by Archaeological Survey of India.

See also 
 Jain temples of Khajuraho
 Paramara dynasty

References

Books

Web

External links

Jain temples in Madhya Pradesh
13th-century Jain temples